Xanthopoulos is a Greek surname which means "son of Xanthos", where Xanthos means a person with "yellow, fair hair". Its female version corresponds to the masculine genitive Xanthopoulou. The name may refer to:

Basilis C. Xanthopoulos (1951–1990), Greek physicist
Callistus Xanthopoulos (died 1397), Patriarch of Constantinople
Charalambos Xanthopoulos (born 1956), Greek football player
Christos Xanthopoulos (born 1954), Greek football player
Ignatios Xanthopoulos, 14th-century Greek Orthodox Christian monk
Isidore Xanthopoulos (died 1462), Patriarch of Constantinople
Nikephoros Kallistos Xanthopoulos, Byzantine historian
Nikos Xanthopoulos (born 1934), Greek actor
Petros Xanthopoulos (born 1959), Greek football player
Vassilis Xanthopoulos (born 1984), Greek basketball player

References

Surnames
Greek-language surnames
Surnames of Greek origin